The Notitiae Episcopatuum (singular: Notitia Episcopatuum) are official documents that furnish Eastern countries the list and hierarchical rank of the metropolitan and suffragan bishoprics of a church.

In the Roman Church (the -mostly Latin Rite- 'Western Patriarchate' of Rome), archbishops and bishops were classed according to the seniority of their consecration, and in Africa according to their age. In the Eastern patriarchates, however, the hierarchical rank of each bishop was determined by the see he occupied.

Thus, in the Patriarchate of Constantinople, the first Metropolitan was not the longest ordained, but whoever happened to be the incumbent of the See of Caesarea; the second was the Archbishop of Ephesus, and so on. In every ecclesiastical province, the rank of each Suffragan (see) was thus determined, and remained unchanged unless the list was subsequently modified.

The hierarchical order included first of all the Patriarch; then the 'greater Metropolitans', i.e., those who had archdioceses with suffragan sees; next 'Autocephalous Metropolitans', who had no suffragans, and were directly subject to the Patriarch; next other Archbishops, although not functionally differing from autocephalous metropolitans, whose sees occupied hierarchical rank inferior to theirs, and were also immediately dependent on the Patriarch; then 'simple', i.e. exempt bishops, neither Archbishop nor suffragan; and lastly suffragan bishops, who depended on a (Greater) Metropolitan Archbishopric.

It is not known by whom this very ancient order was established, but it is likely that, in the beginning, metropolitan sees and simple exempt bishoprics must have been classified according to the date of their respective foundations, this order being modified later on for political and religious considerations.

The principal documents (by church) are :

Patriarchate of Constantinople 
The Ecthesis of pseudo-Epiphanius, a 7th century revision of an earlier Notitia Episcopatuum (that was created probably by Patriarch Epiphanius under Byzantine Emperor Justinian I), compiled and amended during the reign of Emperor Heraclius I (610-641) and his successors.
a Notitia dating back to the first years of the ninth century and differing but little from the earlier one
the Notitia of Basil the Armenian drawn up between 820 and 842; 
the Notitia compiled by Leo VI the Wise, and Patriarch Nicholas Mysticus between 901 and 907, modifying the hierarchical order established in the seventh century and since disturbed by incorporation of the ecclesiastical provinces of Illyricum and Southern Italy in the Byzantine Patriarchate
the Notitiae episcopatuum of Constantine Porphyrogenitus (about 940), of John I Tzimisces (about 980), of Alexius I Comnenus (about 1084), of Nilus Doxapatris (1143), of Manuel Comnenus (about 1170), of Isaac Angelus (end of twelfth century), of Michael VIII Palaeologus (about 1270), of Andronicus II Palaeologus (about 1299), and of Andronicus III Palaeologus (about 1330).

All these Notitiae are published in:
Gustav Parthey, Hieroclis Synecdemus (Berlin, 1866).
Heinrich Gelzer, Georgii Cyprii Descriptio orbis romani (Leipzig, 1890)
Heinrich Gelzer, Index lectionum Ienae (Jena, 1892)
Heinrich Gelzer, Ungedruckte und ungenügend veröffentlichte Texte der Notitiae episcopatuum (Munich, 1900)

The later works are only more or less modified copies of the Notitia of Leo VI, and therefore do not present the true situation, which was profoundly changed by the Islamic invasions of the region. After the capture of Constantinople by the Turks in 1453, another Notitia was written, portraying the real situation (Gelzer, Ungedruckte Texte der Notitiae episcopatuum 613-37), and on it are based nearly all those that have been written since. The term Syntagmation is now used by the Greeks for these documents.

Patriarchate of Antioch 
We know of only one Notitia episcopatuum for the Church of Antioch, viz. that drawn up in the sixth century by Patriarch Anastasius (see Vailhe in Échos d'Orient, X, pp. 90–101, 139-145, 363-8).

Patriarchates of Jerusalem and Alexandria 
The Patriarchate of Jerusalem has no such document, nor has that of Alexandria, although for the latter Gelzer has collected documents that may help remedy the deficiency (Byzantische Zeitschrift, II, 23-40). De Rougé (Géographie ancienne de la Basse-Egypte, Paris, 1891, 151-61) has published a Coptic document that has not yet been studied. For the Bulgarian Church of Achrida, see Gelzer, Byzantische Zeitschrift, II, 40-66, and Der Patriarchat von Achrida (Leipzig, 1902). Other churches having Notitiae are Cypriot Orthodox Church, Serbian Orthodox Church, Russian Orthodox Church and Georgian Orthodox Church.

References

Editions

Bibliography

External links

 Catholic Encyclopedia "Notitiae Episcopatuum" at New Advent
 English version of the Notitia of Pseudo-Epiphanius with most cities geolocated, by John Brady Kiesling for ToposText

Eastern Orthodox Church
Oriental Orthodoxy

Catholic ecclesiastical titles